Omiodes fulvicauda is a moth in the family Crambidae. It was described by George Hampson in 1898. It is found in Venezuela, Costa Rica and Panama.

References

Moths described in 1898
fulvicauda